Novostepanovka is a rural locality (a selo) in Klimoutsevsky Selsoviet of Svobodnensky District, Amur Oblast, Russia. The population is 219 as of 2018.

Geography 
The village is located on the Malaya Belaya River, 69 km north-west from Svobodny and 24 km from Klimoutsy.

References 

Rural localities in Svobodnensky District